Steve Leung (born 1957) is a leading architect, interior and product designer born in Hong Kong in 1957. Steve's works reflect the projects' unique characters with his contemporary touch, taking inspirations from the Asian culture and arts.

Introduction
Steve set up his own architectural and urban planning consultancy in 1987 and later restructured it into Steve Leung Architects Ltd. (SLA) and Steve Leung Designers Ltd. (SLD) in 1997. Headquartered in Hong Kong and has four branch offices in Beijing, Shanghai, Guangzhou and Shenzhen, it is one of the largest interior design practices in Asia. In 2018, SLD Group is listed on the main board of the Hong Kong Stock Exchange (SEHK: 2262). The Group has 600 high-calibre staff to work on projects spread over 100 cities around the world. With SLD's continual dedications, it is recognised as the World No.1 interior design firm in the Residential Category for three consecutive years from 2016-2018 and ranked 21st in Global Rankings by “Top 100 Giants Research” issued by the Interior Design Magazine of the United States.

Steve has served the interior design industry with enthusiasm. Steve is currently the President of International Federation of Interior Architects/Designers (IFI) 2017-2019 and the Executive Director of Design Committee at China National Interior Decoration Association (CIDA). In 2014, he joined hands with interior designers from Mainland China, Hong Kong and Taiwan to establish “C Foundation” to promote education and foster development of the design industry. In 2016, he was conferred the Vocational Training Council (VTC) Honorary Fellowship by the Secretary in recognition of his contributions to the development of vocational and professional education and training to Hong Kong. In 2018-2019, he was appointed as member of the Trade and Industry Advisory Board (TIAB) by the Secretary for Commerce and Economic Development of Hong Kong SAR Government and Chairman of HKTDC Design, Marketing and Licensing Services Advisory Committee.

Steve established a restaurant operation and management group named "1957 & Co." in 2007.

Awards
 Awarded as one of the World’s Best Interior Designers by Andrew Martin International Interior Design Awards, the virtual Oscars widely recognised in the interior design industry for 14 times during the years
 Listed in “50 Most Influential Person of in 2015” by INTERNI
 Listed in “30 Most Influential Designers” by FORBES China

References

Living people
1957 births
Chinese interior designers
Hong Kong designers